The 45 class are a class of diesel-electric locomotives built by AE Goodwin, Auburn for the New South Wales Department of Railways between 1962 and 1964.

History
The 45 class were built by Alco's Australian licensee AE Goodwin, and are based on the Alco DL-541 model. They initially entered service on the Main Southern line but later operated on all main lines. One was destroyed in a collision in May 1972.

From June 1984, the Australian Federated Union of Locomotive Enginemen placed a ban on the class as leading locomotives, meaning they could only be used as second locomotives, although they were able to be used on Sydney metropolitan trip and Liverpool Range banking duties.

Six were fitted with upgraded cabs and modified bogies at Cardiff Workshops in 1989 and reclassified as class 451s and later class 35s, allowing them again to be used as lead locomotives, although they spent most of their time being used as Liverpool Range bankers and Yeerongpilly, Brisbane shunters. Following a poor wheat crop, the Class 45s were placed in store at Junee Locomotive Depot in December 1991. A locomotive shortage saw most return to service from March 1993. They remained in service until replaced by FreightCorp by Class 82s in 1994/95.

Thirty-two were auctioned in December 1994 with most being sold for scrap. One was retained by the State Rail Authority as a designated heritage locomotive while four were transferred to Rail Services Australia before being sold to Great Northern Rail Services in 2000. One remains in service with Greentrains.

Survivors
4501 sold to Great Northern Rail Services 2000 (unused), then to Silverton Rail (unused), then to Chicago Freight Car Leasing Australia (unused), then to Goodwin Alco Pty Ltd who restored it to main line condition at Eveleigh Railway Workshops in 2007, leasing it to 3801 Limited. Now based at Thirlmere and leased to Transport Heritage NSW for heritage work.
4502 sold to Great Northern Rail Services 2000 (unused), then to Silverton Rail (unused), then to Chicago Freight Car Leasing Australia (unused), then Lachlan Valley Railway in 2012, stored at Broken Hill
3505 sold to Junee Railway Workshop. Was meant to be rebuilt with a Pilbara cab, but the project fell through and it eventually was forgotten about. Its engine cladding has since been removed and it is being used as a mobile loco service stand, while the Pilbara cab was painted blue and yellow and is used as a picnic stand.
4520 is part of the Transport Heritage NSW collection operating in the custody of the NSW Rail Museum
4521 is preserved by the Dorrigo Steam Railway & Museum
4528 sold to Great Northern Rail Services 2000 (unused), then to Silverton Rail (unused), then to Chicago Freight Car Leasing Australia (unused), then Lachlan Valley Railway in 2012, stored at Broken Hill, Silverton Rail had started a rebuilt it as 45s2, but the project was not completed
3532 sold to Great Northern Rail Services 2000 (unused), then to Silverton Rail entering service in June 2002 as 45s1, sold to Greentrains, remained in service in December 2013. Sold to Southern Shorthaul Railroad April 2016 Renumbered 4532 as of August 2019 
4537 sold to Junee Railway Workshops rebuilt with a lowered and shortened No.1 end, leased in June 1995 to BHP for use on their Port Kembla network as 103, later sold to Patrick Portlink

Fleet Status

4501 - Preserved [Operational] Based at Thirlmere

4502 - Preserved Stored

4503 - scrapped 

4504 - Scrapped

4505 ▶ 3505 - Stored

4506 - Scrapped

4507 ▶ 3507 - Scrapped

4508 - Scrapped

4509 - Scrapped

4510 - Scrapped

4511 - Scrapped

4512 - Scrapped

4513 ▶ 3513 - Scrapped

4514 - Scrapped

4515 - Scrapped

4516 - Scrapped

4517 - Scrapped

4518 ▶ 3518 - Scrapped

4519 - Scrapped

4520 - Preserved [Under repairs]

4521 - Preserved

4522 - Scrapped

4523 - Scrapped

4524 - Scrapped

4525 - Scrapped

4526 - Scrapped

4527 ▶ 3527 - Scrapped

4528 - Preserved Stored ( rebuild was stopped by silverton, was going to be 45s2)

4529 - Scrapped

4530 - Scrapped

4531 - ???

4532 ▶ 3532 ▶ 45s1 ▶ 4532  Operational

4533 - Scrapped

4534 - Scrapped

4535 - Scrapped

4536 - Scrapped

4537 ▶ 103 - Operational

4538 - Scrapped

4539 - Scrapped

4540 - Scrapped

References

Further reading

External links

A. E. Goodwin locomotives
Co-Co locomotives
Diesel locomotives of New South Wales
Railway locomotives introduced in 1962
Standard gauge locomotives of Australia
Diesel-electric locomotives of Australia